Brays may refer to:

 Brays, Missouri, United States, an unincorporated community
 Brays Fork, Virginia, United States, an unincorporated community also known as Brays
 Brays Creek, New South Wales, Australia